Steinmetzite is a very rare phosphate mineral with formula Zn2Fe(PO4)2(OH)•3H2O. It was discovered among pegmatites of Hagendorf in Germany, that are famous for rare phosphate minerals. Steinmetzite is chemically related to phosphophyllite and other zinc iron phosphates, namely plimerite and zinclipscombite.

References

Zinc minerals
Iron(III) minerals
Phosphate minerals
Triclinic minerals
Minerals in space group 2
Minerals described in 2017